Jonas Björkman and Max Mirnyi were the defending champions.

Björkman and Mirnyi successfully defended their title, defeating Bob Bryan and Mike Bryan 6–4, 6–4 in the final.

Seeds

Draw

Finals

Top half

Bottom half

References
Draw

2006 NASDAQ-100 Open
2006 ATP Tour